Aq Qaleh Golabar castle is a historical castle located in Ijrud County in Zanjan Province, The longevity of this fortress dates back to the Middle Ages Historical periods after Islam.

References 

Castles in Iran